Lubomír Zajíček (February 15, 1946 – May 14, 2013) was a Czech volleyball player who competed for Czechoslovakia in the 1968 Summer Olympics and in the 1972 Summer Olympics. He was born in Bystrc. In 1968, he was part of the Czechoslovak team which won the bronze medal in the Olympic tournament. He played two matches. Four years later he finished sixth with the Czechoslovak team in the 1972 Olympic tournament. He played four matches.

References

External links
Lubomír Zajíček's profile at Sports Reference.com
Biography of Lubomír Zajíček 

1946 births
2013 deaths
Czech men's volleyball players
Czechoslovak men's volleyball players
Olympic volleyball players of Czechoslovakia
Volleyball players at the 1968 Summer Olympics
Volleyball players at the 1972 Summer Olympics
Olympic bronze medalists for Czechoslovakia
Sportspeople from Brno
Olympic medalists in volleyball
Medalists at the 1968 Summer Olympics